The Groß Wartenberg district, known until 1888 as the Wartenberg district, was a Prussian district in Silesia from 1742 to 1945. Its capital was the town of Groß Wartenberg, which was known until 1888 as Polnisch Wartenberg. The area of this district now lies within the Lower Silesian Voivodeship of Poland.

History 

After conquering most of Silesia, King Frederick the Great introduced Prussian administrative structures in Lower Silesia by cabinet order on November 25, 1741. This included the establishment of two war and domain chambers in Breslau and Glogau as well as their subdivision into districts and the establishment of district administrators on January 1, 1742. Leonhard Moritz von Prittwitz-Gaffron was appointed as the first district administrator of the Wartenberg district.

In the course of the Stein-Hardenberg Reforms in 1815, the district was assigned to Regierungsbezirk Breslau in the Province of Silesia. During the district reform of 1818 in Regierungsbezirk Breslau, the city of Medzibor and the villages of Benjaminsthal, Charlottenfeld, Conradau, Erdmannsberg, Friedrikenau, Glashütte, Glashütte bei Tscheschen, Hammer, Honig, Johannisdörfel, Joschune, Kalkowsky, Kenschen, Kenschenhammer, Klenowe, Kottowsky, Kotzine, Mariendorf, Neurode, Ossen, Pawlau, Riefken, Silonke, Suschen, Tscheschen and Wielky were transferred from the Oels district to the Wartenberg district.

The city of Medzibor was renamed Neumittelwalde in 1886. Since the district capital was renamed Groß Wartenberg from Polnisch Wartenberg in 1888, the official name of the district was also changed to Groß Wartenberg.

In 1919, the Free State of Prussia dissolved the Province of Silesia and divided it into the Province of Lower Silesia and the Province of Upper Silesia. Consequently, the Groß Wartenberg district became part of the Province of Lower SIlesia. With the entry into force of the Treaty of Versailles on January 10, 1920, the eastern, predominantly Polish-speaking part of the Groß Wartenberg district fell to Poland.

After the Invasion of Poland in 1939, the areas of the Lower Silesian districts of Namslau, Groß Wartenberg and Guhrau, which had been ceded to Poland in 1920, were not returned to Silesia, but were incorporated into Reichsgau Wartheland. In the spring of 1945 the Red Army occupied the district and in the summer of 1945 placed it under the administration of Poland in accordance with the Potsdam Agreement.

Demographics 
According to the Prussian census of 1861, the district had a population of 49,791, of which 20,833 (41.8%) spoke German, 27,734 (55.7%) spoke Polish, and 1,224 (2.5%) spoke Czech. However, a few decades later, German speakers formed the majority of the district population.

References 

Groß Wartenberg
Oleśnica County
1742 establishments in Prussia
1945 disestablishments in Germany
1945 disestablishments in Poland